Comamonas testosteroni is a Gram-negative soil bacterium. Strain I2gfp has been used in bioaugmentation trials, in attempts to treat the industrial byproduct 3-chloroaniline.

This species can also digest plastic.

References

External links
 

Comamonadaceae
Bacteria described in 1956
Organisms breaking down plastic